The Mexico–United States barrier (also known as the US–Mexico border wall or simply the "border wall") is a series of vertical barriers along the Mexico–United States border intended to reduce illegal immigration to the United States from Mexico. The barrier is not a continuous structure but a series of obstructions variously classified as "fences" or "walls".

Between the physical barriers, security is provided by a "virtual fence" of sensors, cameras, and other surveillance equipment used to dispatch United States Border Patrol agents to suspected migrant crossings. In May 2011, the Department of Homeland Security (DHS) stated that it had  of barriers in place. An additional  of primary barriers were built during Donald Trump's presidency. On July 28, 2022, the Biden administration announced it would fill four wide gaps in Arizona near Yuma, an area with some of the busiest corridors for illegal crossings.

Description 
The  border between the United States and Mexico traverses a variety of terrains, including urban areas and deserts. The border from the Gulf of Mexico to El Paso, Texas, follows along the Rio Grande forming a natural barrier. The barrier is located on both urban and uninhabited sections of the border, areas where the most concentrated numbers of illegal crossings and drug trafficking have been observed in the past. These urban areas include San Diego, California, and El Paso, Texas. The fencing includes a steel fence (varying in height between 18 and 27 feet) that divides the border towns of Nogales, Arizona, in the U.S. and Nogales, Sonora, in Mexico.

97% of border apprehensions (foreign nationals who are caught being in the U.S. illegally) by the Border Patrol in 2010 occurred at the southwest border. The number of Border Patrol apprehensions declined 61% from 1,189,000 in 2005 to 723,842 in 2008 to 463,000 in 2010. The decrease in apprehensions are the result of numerous factors, including changes in U.S. economic conditions and border enforcement efforts. Border apprehensions in 2010 were at their lowest level since 1972. Total apprehensions for 2017, 2018, and 2019 were 415,517, 521,090, 977,509 respectively. This shows a recent increase in apprehensions. And while the barrier is along the Mexico-United States border, 80% of the apprehended crossers are non-Mexican.

As a result of the barrier, there has been a significant increase in the number of people trying to cross areas that have no fence, such as the Sonoran Desert and the Baboquivari Mountains in Arizona. Such immigrants must cross fifty miles (80 km) of inhospitable terrain to reach the first road, which is located in the Tohono O'odham Indian Reservation.

Geography 
The Mexico–United States border stretches from the Pacific Ocean in the west to the Gulf of Mexico in the east. Border states include the Mexican states of Baja California, Sonora, Chihuahua, Coahuila, Nuevo León, and Tamaulipas.  U.S. states along the border are California, Arizona, New Mexico, and Texas.

History

Origins
Territorial exchanges in the Mexican–American War (1846–1848) and the Gadsden Purchase (1853) would largely establish the current U.S.-Mexico border. Until the early 20th century, the border was open and largely unpatrolled, with only a few "mounted guards" patrolling its length. However, tensions between the United States and Mexico started to rise with the Mexican Revolution (1910) and World War I, which also increased concerns about weapons smuggling, refugees and cross-border espionage. The first international bridge was the Brownsville & Matamoros International Bridge built in 1910. The first barrier built by the U.S. (a barbed wire fence to prevent the movement of cattle across the border) was built in Ambos Nogales between 1909 and 1911. The first barrier built by Mexico was likely a six-foot-tall wire fence built in 1918 explicitly for the purpose of directing the flow of people, also in Ambos Nogales. Barriers were extended in the following decades, with barriers becoming a common feature in border towns by the 1920s. In the 1940s, the U.S. Immigration and Naturalization Service built chain-link barriers along the border.

U.S. President George H. W. Bush approved the initial 14 miles of fencing along the San Diego–Tijuana border. In 1993, President Bill Clinton oversaw initial border fence construction which was completed by the end of the year. Starting in 1994, further barriers were built under Clinton's presidency as part of three larger operations to taper transportation of illegal drugs manufactured in Latin America and immigration: Operation Gatekeeper in California, Operation Hold-the-Line in Texas, and Operation Safeguard in Arizona. Clinton signed the Illegal Immigration Reform and Immigrant Responsibility Act of 1996, which authorized further barriers and the reinforcement of the initial border fence. The majority of the border barriers built in the 1990s were made out of leftover helicopter landing mats from the Vietnam War.

Bush administration 

The Real ID Act, signed into law by President George W. Bush on May 11, 2005, attached a rider to a supplemental appropriations bill funding the wars in Iraq and Afghanistan, which went into effect in May 2008:Notwithstanding any other provision of law, the Secretary of Homeland Security shall have the authority to waive all legal requirements such Secretary, in such Secretary's sole discretion, determines necessary to ensure expeditious construction of the barriers and roads.

In 2005, there were 75 miles of fencing along the border. In 2005, the border-located Laredo Community College obtained a 10-foot fence built by the United States Marine Corps. The structure led to a reported decline in border crossings on to the campus. U.S. Representative Duncan Hunter of California proposed a plan on November 3, 2005, calling for the construction of a reinforced fence along the entire United States–Mexico border. This would also have included a  border zone on the U.S. side. On December 15, 2005, Congressman Hunter's amendment to the Border Protection, Anti-terrorism, and Illegal Immigration Control Act of 2005 (H.R. 4437) passed in the House, but the bill did not pass the Senate. This plan called for mandatory fencing along 698 miles (1,123 km) of the 1,954-mile (3,145-kilometer)-long border. On May 17, 2006, the U.S. Senate proposed the Comprehensive Immigration Reform Act of 2006 (S. 2611), which would include  of triple-layered fencing and a vehicle fence, but the bill died in committee.

Secure Fence Act of 2006

The Secure Fence Act of 2006, signed into law on October 26, 2006, by President George W. Bush authorized and partially funded the potential construction of 700 miles (1,125 km) of physical fence/barriers along the Mexican border. The bill passed with supermajorities in both chambers. Secretary of Homeland Security Michael Chertoff announced that an eight-month test of the virtual fence he favored would precede any construction of a physical barrier.

The government of Mexico and ministers of several Latin American countries condemned the plans. Governor of Texas Rick Perry expressed his opposition, saying that the border should be more open and should support safe and legal migration with the use of technology. The barrier expansion was opposed by a unanimous vote by the Laredo, Texas, City Council. Laredo Mayor Raul G. Salinas said that the bill would devastate Laredo. He stated "These are people that are sustaining our economy by forty percent, and I am gonna close the door on them and put [up] a wall? You don't do that. It's like a slap in the face." He hoped that Congress would revise the bill to better reflect the realities of life on the border.

Secretary Chertoff exercised his waiver authority on April 1, 2008, to "waive in their entirety" the Endangered Species Act, the Migratory Bird Treaty Act, the National Environmental Policy Act, the Coastal Zone Management Act, the Clean Water Act, the Clean Air Act, and the National Historic Preservation Act to extend triple fencing through the Tijuana River National Estuarine Research Reserve near San Diego.
By January 2009, U.S. Customs and Border Protection and Homeland Security had spent $40 million on environmental analysis and mitigation measures aimed at blunting any possible adverse impact that the fence might have on the environment. On January 16, 2009, DHS announced it was pledging an additional $50 million for that purpose, and signed an agreement with the U.S. Department of the Interior for utilization of the additional funding.

Obama administration 
On March 16, 2010, DHS announced that there would be a halt to expand the virtual fence beyond two pilot projects in Arizona. Contractor Boeing Corporation had numerous delays and cost overruns. Boeing had initially used police-dispatching software that was unable to process all of the information coming from the border. The $50 million of remaining funding would be used for mobile surveillance devices, sensors, and radios to patrol and protect the border. At the time, DHS had spent $3.4 billion on border fences and had built  of fences and barriers as part of the Secure Border Initiative.

Of this, vehicle barriers comprised  and pedestrian fence . Obama stated that:We have gone above and beyond what was requested by the very Republicans who said they supported broader reform as long as we got serious about enforcement. All the stuff they asked for, we've done. But ... I suspect there are still going to be some who are trying to move the goal posts on us one more time. They'll want a higher fence. Maybe they'll need a moat. Maybe they want alligators in the moat. They'll never be satisfied. And I understand that. That's politics.

The Republican Party's 2012 platform stated that "The double-layered fencing on the border that was enacted by Congress in 2006, but never completed, must finally be built." The Secure Fence Act's costs were estimated at $6 billion, more than the Customs and Border Protection's entire annual discretionary budget of $5.6 billion. The Washington Office on Latin America noted in 2013 that the cost of complying with the Secure Fence Act's mandate was the reason that it had not been completely fulfilled.

A 2016 report by the Government Accountability Office confirmed that the government had completed the fence by 2015. A 2017 report noted that "In addition to the 654 miles of primary fencing, [Customs and Border Protection] has also deployed additional layers of pedestrian fencing behind the primary border fencing, including 37 miles of secondary fencing and 14 miles of tertiary fencing."

Trump administration

Throughout his 2016 presidential campaign, Donald Trump called for the construction of a much larger and fortified border wall, claiming that if elected, he would "build the wall and make Mexico pay for it". Mexican President Enrique Peña Nieto maintained that his country would not pay for the wall. On January 25, 2017, the Trump administration signed Executive Order 13767, which formally directed the US government to begin attempting to construct a border wall using existing federal funding, although construction did not begin at this time because a formal budget had not been developed.

Trump's campaign promise has faced a host of legal and logistical challenges since. In March 2018, the Trump administration secured $1.6 billion from Congress for projects at the border for existing designs of approximately 100 miles of new and replacement walls. From December 22, 2018, to January 25, 2019, the federal government was partially shut down because of Trump's declared intention to veto any spending bill that did not include $5 billion in funding for a border wall.

On May 24, 2019, federal Judge Haywood Gilliam in the Northern District of California granted a preliminary injunction preventing the Trump administration from redirecting funds under the national emergency declaration issued earlier in the year to fund a planned wall along the border with Mexico. The injunction applies specifically to money the administration intended to allocate from other agencies and limits wall construction projects in El Paso and Yuma. On June 28, Gilliam blocked the reallocation of $2.5 billion of funding from the Department of Defense to the construction of segments of the border wall categorized as high priority by the Trump administration (spanning across Arizona, California and New Mexico). The decision was upheld five days later by a majority in the Ninth Circuit Appeals Court but was overturned by the U.S. Supreme Court on July 26. On September 3, Secretary of Defense Mark Esper authorized the use of $3.6 billion in military construction funding for 175 miles of the barrier. The House and Senate have twice voted to terminate Trump's emergency declaration, but the president vetoed both resolutions. In October, a lawsuit filed in El Paso County produced a ruling that the emergency declaration was unlawful, as it fails to meet the National Emergencies Act's definition of an emergency. On December 10, a federal judge in the case blocked the use of the funding, but on January 8, 2020, a federal appeals court granted a stay of the ruling, freeing $3.6 billion for the wall.

, the Trump administration's barrier construction had been limited to replacing sections that were in need of repair or outdated, with 60 miles of replacement wall built in the Southwest since 2017. As of September 12, 2019, the Trump administration plans for "Between 450 and 500 miles (724–806 kilometers) of fencing along the nearly 2,000-mile (3,218-kilometer) border by the end of 2020" with an estimated total cost of $18.4 billion. Privately owned land adjacent to the border would have to be acquired by the U.S. government to be built upon.

U.S. Customs and Border Protection confirmed that almost all of this was replacement fencing. By the end of Trump's term on January 21, 2021,  had been built at last report by CBP on January 5, much of it replacing outdated or dilapidated existing barriers.

Contractors and independent efforts
As of February 2019, contractors were preparing to construct $600 million worth of replacement barriers along the south Texas Rio Grande Valley section of the border wall, approved by Congress in March 2018. In mid-April 2019, former Kansas Secretary of State Kris Kobach visited Coolidge, Arizona, to observe a demonstration by North Dakota's Fisher Industries of how it would build a border fence. The company maintained that it could erect 218 miles of the barrier for $3.3 billion and be able to complete it in 13 months. Spin cameras positioned atop the fence would use facial-recognition technology, and underground fiber optic cables could detect and differentiate between human activity, vehicles, tunneling, and animals as distant as 40 feet away. The proposed barrier would be constructed with 42 miles (68 km) near Yuma and 91 miles (147 km) near Tucson, Arizona, 69 miles near El Paso, Texas, and 15 miles (25 km) near El Centro, California—reportedly costing $12.5 million per mile. In April 2019, U.S. Senator Bill Cassidy said that he traveled with the group of politicians and administration officials over the Easter recess to Coolidge (120 miles north of the Mexico border) because he felt that insufficient barrier and border enhancements had been erected since Trump became president. U.S. senator Kevin Cramer was also there, promoting Fisher Industries, which demonstrated the construction of a 56-foot (18 m) fence in Coolidge.

A private organization founded by military veteran Brian Kolfage called "We Build the Wall" raised over $20 million beginning in 2018, with President Trump's encouragement and with leadership from Kobach and Steve Bannon.  Over the 2019 Memorial Day weekend, the organization constructed a 1/2 to 1-mile "weathered steel" bollard fence near El Paso on private land adjoining the US–Mexico border using $6–8 million of the donated funds. Kolfage's organization says it has plans to construct further barriers on private lands adjoining the border in Texas and California. On December 3, 2019, a Hidalgo County judge ordered the group to temporarily halt all construction because of its plans to build adjacent to the Rio Grande, which a lawyer for the National Butterfly Center argues would create a flooding risk. On January 9, 2020, a federal judge lifted an injunction, allowing a construction firm to move forward with the 3 mile project along the Rio Grande. This ended a month long court battle with both the Federal Government and the National Butterfly Center which both tried to block construction efforts.

Biden administration
President Joe Biden signed an executive order on his first day of office, January 20, 2021, ordering a "pause" in all construction of the wall no later than January 27. The government was given two months to plan how to spend the funds elsewhere and determine how much it would cost to terminate the contracts. There are no plans to tear down parts of the wall that have been built. The deployment of 3,000 National Guard troops along the border will continue. The Biden administration has continued to seize land for construction of the border wall. By December 2021, many contracts had been cancelled, including one requiring the possession of the land of a family represented by the Texas Civil Rights Project.

In June 2021, Texas governor Greg Abbott announced plans to build a border wall in his state, saying that the state would provide $250 million and that direct donations from the public would be solicited. On June 29, the Republican Study Committee organized a group of two dozen Republican House members to visit a gap in the border where Central Americans were crossing into the country. Representative Mary Miller  stated that "obviously our president has advertised this and facilitated this invasion". Rep. Jim Banks  praised the effectiveness of Trump's wall and said that because of the halted construction, "thousands of migrants [pass] through this area on a regular basis ... because there's an open door that allows them to do that". In reference to wristbands on migrants used by Mexican cartels and smugglers to track them, Rep. Madison Cawthorn  stated, "They're basically treating people like Amazon products. ... There is no care that that is a human being, someone who has a soul, someone who has unalienable rights that predate any government."

On July 28, 2022, the Biden administration announced it would fill four wide gaps in Arizona near Yuma, an area with some of the busiest corridors for illegal crossings.

Binational River Park 
In 2021, in collaboration with United States and Mexican ambassadors, as well as businessmen, a binational park was proposed along the Rio Grande between the border towns of Laredo, Texas, and Nuevo Laredo, Mexico. Supported by the No Border Wall Coalition, the park aims to create a shared recreational space instead of a border wall. Earthjustice estimated that the decision to not build a border wall in Laredo saved 71 miles of river from destruction and over $1 billion in taxpayer dollars.

Arizona container wall 
In August 2022, Arizona Governor Doug Ducey ordered the erection of a makeshift wall of shipping containers on the border with Mexico in Cochise County, Arizona. The construction began in the Coronado National Forest without authorization from the U.S. Forest Service, which operates the land. Ecologists at the Center for Biological Diversity argue that the construction, which imperils at-risk species including the ocelot and jaguar, violates the Endangered Species Act of 1973 and have sued to halt its construction. Governor-elect Katie Hobbs stated that she would remove the containers after taking office, and the U.S. Justice Department sued the state to remove the containers and "compensate the [U.S.] for any actions it needs to take to undo Arizona's actions". Deconstruction had begun by January.

Controversy

Effectiveness
Research at Texas A&M University and Texas Tech University indicates that the wall, like border walls in general, is unlikely to be effective at reducing illegal immigration or movement of contraband. In mid-April 2019, U.S. Senator Martha McSally said that a barrier will not resolve the border crisis. Authors of books on the effectiveness have said that aside from the human crossings, drugs among other things will still be making their way to the United States illegally. However, US Customs and Border Protection has frequently called for more physical barriers on the Mexico–United States border, citing their efficacy. Smugglers in 2021 used demolition tools and power saws on pieces of wall in Arizona.

Divided land

Tribal lands of three indigenous nations are divided by a proposed border fence.

On January 27, 2008, a Native American human rights delegation in the United States, which included Margo Tamez (Lipan Apache-Jumano Apache) and Teresa Leal (Opata-Mayo) reported the removal of the official International Boundary obelisks of 1848 by the U.S. Department of Homeland Security in the Las Mariposas, Sonora-Arizona sector of the Mexico–U.S. border.

The proposed route for the border fence would divide the campus of the University of Texas at Brownsville into two parts, according to Antonio N. Zavaleta, a vice president of the university. There have been campus protests against the wall by students who feel it will harm their school. In August 2008, UT-Brownsville reached an agreement with the U.S. Department of Homeland Security for the university to construct a portion of the fence across and adjacent to its property. The southern perimeter of the UT-Brownsville campus will be part of a laboratory for testing new security technology and infrastructure combinations. The border fence segment on the campus was substantially completed by December 2008.

Santa Ana National Wildlife Refuge 
On August 1, 2018, the chief of the Border Patrol's Rio Grande Valley sector indicated that although Starr County was his first priority for a wall, Hidalgo County's Santa Ana National Wildlife Refuge had been selected instead for initial construction, because its land was owned by the government.

National Butterfly Center 
The proposed border wall has been described as a "death sentence" for the American National Butterfly Center, a privately operated outdoor butterfly conservatory that maintains a significant amount of land in Mexico. Filmmaker Krista Schlyer, part of an all-woman team creating a documentary film about the butterflies and the border wall, Ay Mariposa, estimates that construction would put "70 percent of the preserve habitat" on the Mexican side of the border. In addition to concerns about seizure of private property by the federal government, center employees have also noted the local economic impact. The center's director has stated that "environmental tourism contributes more than $450m to Hidalgo and Starr counties."

In early December 2018, a challenge to wall construction at the National Butterfly Center was rejected by the U.S. Supreme Court. According to the San Antonio Express News, "the high court let stand an appeals ruling that lets the administration bypass 28 federal laws", including the Endangered Species Act, the Safe Drinking Water Act and the Native American Graves Protection and Repatriation Act.

Mexico's condemnations

In 2006, the Mexican government vigorously condemned the Secure Fence Act of 2006. Mexico has also urged the U.S. to alter its plans for expanded fences along their shared border, saying that it would damage the environment and harm wildlife. 

In one of his speeches he criticized the U.S. government for building the barriers and asked for them to be removed, referencing President Ronald Reagan's "Tear down this wall!" speech from Berlin in 1987.

Migrant deaths 

Between 1994 and 2007, there were around 5,000 migrant deaths along the Mexico–United States border, according to a document created by the Human Rights National Commission of Mexico, also signed by the American Civil Liberties Union. Between 43 and 61 people died trying to cross the Sonoran Desert from October 2003 to May 2004; three times that of the same period the previous year. In October 2004, the Border Patrol announced that 325 people had died crossing the entire border during the previous 12 months. Between 1998 and 2004, 1,954 persons are officially reported to have died along the Mexico–U.S. border. Since 2004, the bodies of 1,086 migrants have been recovered in the southern Arizona desert.

U.S. Border Patrol Tucson Sector reported on October 15, 2008, that its agents were able to save 443 illegal immigrants from certain death after being abandoned by their smugglers. The agents also reducing the number of deaths by 17% from 202 in 2007 to 167 in 2008. Without the efforts of these agents, hundreds more could have died in the deserts of Arizona. According to the same sector, border enhancements like the wall have allowed the Tucson Sector agents to reduce the number of apprehensions at the borders by 16% compared with 2007.

Environmental impact

In April 2008, the Department of Homeland Security announced plans to waive more than 30 environmental and cultural laws to speed construction of the barrier. Despite claims from then Homeland Security Chief Michael Chertoff that the department would minimize the construction's impact on the environment, critics in Arizona, New Mexico, and Texas, asserted that the fence endangered species and fragile ecosystems along the Rio Grande. Environmentalists expressed concern about butterfly migration corridors and the future of species of local wildcats, the ocelot, the jaguarundi, and the jaguar.

By August 2008, more than 90% of the southern border in Arizona and New Mexico had been surveyed. In addition, 80% of the California–Mexico border has been surveyed. About 100 species of plants and animals, many already endangered, are threatened by the wall, including the jaguar, ocelot, Sonoran pronghorn, Mexican wolf, a pygmy owl, the thick-billed parrot, and the Quino checkerspot butterfly. According to Scott Egan of Rice University, a wall can create a population bottleneck, increase inbreeding, and cut off natural migration routes and range expansion.

In 2008 a resolution "based on sound and accurate scientific knowledge" expressing opposition to the wall and the harmful impact on several rare, threatened, and endangered species, particularly endangered mammals such as the jaguar, ocelot, jaguarondi, and Sonoran pronghorn, was published by The Southwestern Association of Naturalists, an organization of 791 scientists specializing in the zoology, botany, and ecology of southwestern USA and Mexico. A decade later in 2018, well over 2500 scientists from 43 countries published a statement opposing the Border Wall, affirming it will have "significant consequences for biodiversity" and "Already-built sections of the wall are reducing the area, quality, and connectivity of plant and animal habitats and are compromising more than a century of binational investment in conservation."

An initial  wall for which U.S. funding has been requested on the nearly  mile border would pass through the Tijuana Slough National Wildlife Refuge in California, the Santa Ana National Wildlife Refuge and Lower Rio Grande Valley National Wildlife Refuge in Texas, and Mexico's Cabeza Prieta National Wildlife Refuge and El Pinacate y Gran Desierto de Altar Biosphere Reserve, which is a UNESCO World Heritage Site that the U.S. is bound by global treaty to protect. The U.S. Customs and Border Protection plans to build the wall using the Real ID Act to avoid the process of making environmental impact statements, a strategy devised by Chertoff during the Bush administration. Reuters said, "The Real ID Act also allows the secretary of Homeland Security to exempt CBP from adhering to the Endangered Species Act", which would otherwise prohibit construction in a wildlife refuge.

Polling 
A Rasmussen Reports poll from August 19, 2015, found that 51% supported building a wall on the border, while 37% opposed.

In a January 2017 study conducted by the Pew Research Center, 39% of Americans identified construction of a U.S.–Mexico border wall as an "important goal for U.S. immigration policy". The survey found that while Americans were divided by party on many different immigration policies, "the widest [partisan split] by far is over building a southern border wall. Two-thirds of Republicans and Republican-leaning independents (67%) say construction of a wall on the U.S.–Mexico border is an important goal for immigration policy, compared with just 16 percent of Democrats and Democratic leaners."

A survey conducted by the National Border Patrol Council found that 89% of border patrol agents said a "wall system in strategic locations is necessary to securing the border". 7% of agents disagreed.

A poll conducted by CBS in June 21–22 2018 found that 51% supported the border wall, while 48% opposed.

A poll conducted by the Senate Opportunity Fund  in March of 2021 found that 53% supported finishing construction of the border wall, while 38% opposed.

See also 

 Mexico–United States border
 Mexico–United States border crisis
 List of Mexico–United States border crossings
 United States Border Patrol interior checkpoints
 Roosevelt Reservation
 List of walls
 Open border
 Tortilla Wall
 Border barrier
 Separation barrier
 Guatemala–Mexico border
 Israeli West Bank barrier
 Egypt–Israel barrier
 Hungarian border barrier

References 
Footnotes

Citations

Further reading 
 Chaichian, Mohammad. 2014. Empires and Walls: Globalization, Migration, and Colonial Domination (Brill, pp. 175–235)
 
 
 The High Cost and Diminishing Returns of a Border Wall

External links 

 Border Wall System CBP.gov
 This Is What the U.S.–Mexico Border Wall Actually Looks Like. National Geographic Society
 US–Mexico Border Barriers, Historical Timeline and Summary Statistics

 
Anti-immigration politics in the United States
Border barriers
Fortifications in the United States
Barrier
1994 establishments in Mexico
1993 establishments in the United States